Dipterocarpus sublamellatus grows as a large tree up to  tall, with a trunk diameter of up to . Bark is orange-brown. It is found in a variety of now vulnerable habitats from sea-level to  altitude. D. sublamellatus is native to Sumatra, Peninsular Malaysia and Borneo.

References

sublamellatus
Plants described in 1932
Endangered plants
Trees of Sumatra
Trees of Peninsular Malaysia
Trees of Borneo